Bangladesh Agricultural Research Council is the body in charge of the National Agricultural Research System and is located in Farmgate, Dhaka, Bangladesh. The institute won the Independence Award in 2021 for its outstanding contribution to research and training.

History
It was established in 1973 by Presidential Order 32. There are currently eleven national research institute under the body. Seven of the research institutes: Bangladesh Agricultural Research Institute, Bangladesh Wheat and Maize Research Institute, Soil Resources Development Institute, Bangladesh Jute Research Institute, Bangladesh Institute of Nuclear Agriculture, Bangladesh Rice Research Institute, and Bangladesh Sugarcane Research Institute, are under the Ministry of Agriculture. Two research institutes are Bangladesh Fisheries Research Institute and Bangladesh Livestock Research Institute under Ministry of Fisheries and Livestock. The Bangladesh Tea Research Institute is under the Ministry of Industries. The Bangladesh Forest Research Institute is under the Ministry of Environment and Forest.

References

Government agencies of Bangladesh
1973 establishments in Bangladesh
Organisations based in Dhaka
Agricultural research institutes
Agricultural organisations based in Bangladesh
Agriculture research institutes in Bangladesh
Recipients of the Independence Day Award